The 2005–06 Honduran Liga Nacional de Ascenso was the 39th season of the Second level in Honduran football and the fourth one under the name Liga Nacional de Ascenso.  Under the management of Dennis Allen, Atlético Olanchano won the tournament after defeating C.D. Lenca in the promotion series and obtained promotion to the 2006–07 Honduran Liga Nacional.

Apertura

Postseason

Final

 Juticalpa Tulín 1–1 Atlético Olanchano on aggregate.  Atlético Olanchano won 3–2 on penalty kicks.

Clausura

Postseason

Final

 Lenca won 4–1 on aggregate.

Promotion

 Atlético Olanchano won 3–2 on aggregate.

References

Ascenso
2005